The 3rd Critics' Choice Television Awards ceremony, presented by the Broadcast Television Journalists Association (BTJA), honored the best in primetime television programming from June 1, 2012, to May 31, 2013, and was held on June 10, 2013, at The Beverly Hilton in Los Angeles, California. The nominations were announced on May 22, 2013. The ceremony was hosted by comedian and actress Retta, and was live-streamed on Ustream. Bob Newhart received the Critics' Choice Television Icon Award.

Winners and nominees
Winners are listed first and highlighted in boldface:

Shows with multiple wins
The following shows received multiple awards:

Shows with multiple nominations
The following shows received multiple nominations:

Presenters

References

2013 television awards
2013 in American television
 003
2013 in Los Angeles
June 2013 events in the United States